In mathematics, the Pansu derivative is a derivative on a Carnot group, introduced by . A Carnot group  admits a one-parameter family of dilations, .

provided that this limit exists.

A key theorem in this area is the Pansu–Rademacher theorem, a generalization of Rademacher's theorem, which can be stated as follows: Lipschitz continuous functions between (measurable subsets of) Carnot groups are Pansu differentiable almost everywhere.

References

Lie groups